Cejhae Colin Greene (born 6 October 1995) is an Antiguan sprinter. He attended the Princess Margaret School. Cejhae is the first of three children born to Jonah Greene and Colin Greene.

Greene won a bronze medal in the 100 metres at the 2012 Central American and Caribbean Junior Championships in Athletics in San Salvador, El Salvador. In his Olympic debut in Rio at the 2016 Summer Olympics, Greene advanced past the round of heats, but finished seventh in his semifinal and did not advance to the final. 

He qualified for the 2020 Summer Olympics.

In 2017, Greene was named Antigua and Barbuda Sportsman of the Year award.

References

External links

1995 births
Living people
Antigua and Barbuda male sprinters
Athletes (track and field) at the 2014 Commonwealth Games
Athletes (track and field) at the 2018 Commonwealth Games
Commonwealth Games competitors for Antigua and Barbuda
Athletes (track and field) at the 2015 Pan American Games
Athletes (track and field) at the 2016 Summer Olympics
Athletes (track and field) at the 2019 Pan American Games
Olympic athletes of Antigua and Barbuda
World Athletics Championships athletes for Antigua and Barbuda
People from St. John's, Antigua and Barbuda
Georgia Bulldogs track and field athletes
Central American and Caribbean Games bronze medalists for Antigua and Barbuda
Competitors at the 2018 Central American and Caribbean Games
Pan American Games bronze medalists for Antigua and Barbuda
Pan American Games medalists in athletics (track and field)
Central American and Caribbean Games medalists in athletics
Medalists at the 2019 Pan American Games
Athletes (track and field) at the 2020 Summer Olympics
Athletes (track and field) at the 2022 Commonwealth Games